"Just a Dream" is a 1958 single by Jimmy Clanton and His Rockets released on the Ace Records label. The actual record-label states that it was written by Clanton and Cosimo Matassa (Matassa was Clanton's manager), but other sources state that Clanton was the sole composer. 
Original words written by Regina F Phillips and sent to Lew Tobin which were copyrighted. Regina never received credit for the song lyrics.

Apparently Lew Tobin was a bit of a song shark as noted by Randy Johnson.

Chart performance
The single went to number one on the R&B Best Sellers lists for one week and peaked at number four on the Hot 100.

Cover versions
Ruby Winters covered the song in 1969 and it peaked at #40 on the US Best Selling Rhythm & Blues Singles chart.

References

1958 singles
Jimmy Clanton songs
1958 songs
Chris Farlowe songs